Duk may refer to:
 Duk, Isfahan
 Duk, Kohgiluyeh and Boyer-Ahmad
 Duk, Mazandaran